George Warwick Deeping (28 May 1877 – 20 April 1950) was an English novelist and short story writer, whose best-known novel was Sorrell and Son (1925).

Life 
Born in Southend-on-Sea, Essex, into a family of physicians, Warwick Deeping was educated at Merchant Taylors' School. He proceeded to Trinity College, Cambridge, to study medicine and science (receiving his MA in March 1902), then went to Middlesex Hospital to finish his medical training. During the First World War, he served in the Royal Army Medical Corps. Deeping later gave up his job as a physician to become a full-time writer. He married Phyllis Maude Merrill and lived for the rest of his life in "Eastlands" on Brooklands Road, Weybridge, Surrey.

He was one of the best-selling authors of the 1920s and 1930s, with seven of his novels making the best-seller list.
Deeping was a prolific writer of short stories, which appeared in such British magazines as Cassell's, The Story-Teller, and The Strand. He also published fiction in several US magazines, including the Saturday Evening Post and Adventure. All of the short stories and serialised novels in US magazines were reprints of works previously published in Britain.  Well over 200 of his original short stories and essays that appeared in various British fiction magazines were never seen in book form during his lifetime.

Themes 
Deeping's early work is dominated by historical romances. His later novels more usually dealt with modern life, and were critical of many tendencies of twentieth-century civilisation. His standpoint was generally that of a passionate individualism, distrustful both of ruling elites and of the lower classes, who were often presented as a threat to his embattled middle-class protagonists. His most celebrated hero is Captain Sorrell M.C., the ex-officer who after the First World War is reduced to a menial occupation in which he is bullied by those of a lower social class and less education.

Deeping's novels often deal with controversial issues. In her 2009 study, The Ordeal of Warwick Deeping, Mary Grover lists these:
 social work and medicine in the slums (Roper's Row, 1929; The Impudence of Youth, 1946; Paradise Place, 1949.)
 gender ambiguity (The Return of the Petticoat, 1907)
 alcoholism (A Woman's War, 1907; The Woman at the Door, 1937; The Dark House, 1941)
 euthanasia (Sorrell and Son (1925); The Dark House, 1941)
 wife abuse and justifiable homicide (The Woman at the Door, 1937)
 shell shock (The Secret Sanctuary, 1923)
 rape (The White Gate, 1913)
 pollution of the water supply (Sincerity, 1912)

Critical reception 
Despite his use of controversial themes, Deeping received little recognition as a serious writer. George Orwell, whose political beliefs were very different from Deeping's, dismissed him as being among the 'huge tribe' of writers who 'simply don't notice what is happening'. Graham Greene also criticized Deeping's work; in his book Journey Without Maps Greene includes Deeping's novels on a list of books "written without truth, without compulsion, one dull word following another." By contrast, Kingsley Amis gave some guarded praise for Deeping's work. Amis read Deeping's Sorrell and Son and initially disliked the book. However, in a later interview Amis praised Sorrell and Son, saying  "Its sensibility was very crude but it delivered".

Books 

Published posthumously
Time to Heal (1952)
Man in Chains (1953)
The Old World Dies (1954)
Caroline Terrace (1955)
The Serpent's Tooth (1956)
The Sword and the Cross (1957)
 The Lost Stories of Warwick Deeping – Volumes I – VI (2013–2018) – A total of over 3000 pages, containing over 200 short stories, novellas, and essays.  These works were never published in book form and only appeared in British and American fiction magazines in the 1910s-1930s, such as The Story-Teller, The New Magazine, Cassell's Magazine of Fiction, and The Strand.

Films 
Movies based on Deeping's novels belong, with two exceptions, to the silent era. Unrest was filmed in 1920, Fox Farm in 1922, and Doomsday in 1928. Kitty (1929), directed by Victor Saville, was one of the first British talkies (only the second half of the film had a soundtrack).

Sorrell and Son (about an officer who after the First World War finds himself unemployable except in a menial capacity, but who is determined to give his son the best education possible) was filmed three times: It first appeared in 1927 as a silent movie, was remade in 1934 as a sound film, and turned into a TV mini-series in 1984.

References

External links 
Sources

 
 
 
 
 Works by Warwick Deeping at Project Gutenberg of Australia
 

Other
 A 2002 essay by Mary Grover (Sheffield Hallam University), from The Literary Encyclopedia
 WarwickDeeping.com
 George Davidson 'Warwick' Deeping, the Master of the early 20th Century Romance,

1877 births
1950 deaths
Military personnel from Southend-on-Sea
20th-century British novelists
People from Southend-on-Sea
People educated at Merchant Taylors' School, Northwood
Alumni of Trinity College, Cambridge
British Army personnel of World War I
British male novelists
Royal Army Medical Corps officers
20th-century English male writers
English historical novelists
Writers of historical fiction set in the Middle Ages
Writers of historical fiction set in the early modern period